Uvarovka is a rural locality (a village) in Ivanovskoye Rural Settlement, Kovrovsky District, Vladimir Oblast, Russia. The population was 94 as of 2010. There are 2 streets.

Geography 
Uvarovka is located 56 km south of Kovrov (the district's administrative centre) by road. Shevinskaya is the nearest rural locality.

References 

Rural localities in Kovrovsky District